Bitter Beauty is a 2001 album released by Canadian singer/songwriter Jason Collett. Some of the songs, including the title track, were later re-released on Collett's 2003 album Motor Motel Love Songs.

Track listing 
"Bitter Beauty" - 3:40
"Stormy Woman, Salty Girl" - 3:02
"Revolution Style" - 3:46
"Diggin' in the Carpet" - 2:44
"Little Clown" - 3:24
"Something Beautiful" - 2:46
"Gabe" - 3:44
"Honey, I Don't Know" - 2:50
"Runaway" - 2:43
"It's Only Love" - 2:25

References

2001 albums
Jason Collett albums